Lagarto Futebol Clube, commonly known as Lagarto, is a Brazilian football club based in Lagarto, Sergipe state.

Lagarto is currently ranked fifth among Sergipe teams in CBF's national club ranking, at 214th place overall.

History
The club was founded on April 20, 2009. They finished in the second position in the Campeonato Sergipano Série A2 in 2011, losing the league to Sete de Junho, thus gaining promotion to the 2012 First Level.

Stadium
Lagarto Futebol Clube play their home games at Estádio Paulo Barreto de Menezes, nicknamed Barretão. The stadium has a maximum capacity of 8,000 people.

External links

References

Association football clubs established in 2009
Football clubs in Sergipe
2009 establishments in Brazil